Helmi Press-Jansen (15 March 1889 Viljandi – 5 March 1960 Tallinn) was an Estonian politician and feminist. She was a member of Estonian Constituent Assembly.

References

1889 births
1960 deaths
Members of the Estonian Constituent Assembly